The Lean Startup: How Today's Entrepreneurs Use Continuous Innovation to Create Radically Successful Businesses is a book by Eric Ries describing his proposed lean startup strategy for startup companies.

Ries developed the idea for the lean startup from his experiences as a startup advisor, employee, and founder. Ries attributes the failure of his first startup, Catalyst Recruiting, to not understanding the wants of their target customers and focusing too much time and energy on the initial product launch.

After Catalyst, Ries was a senior software engineer with There, Inc., which had a failed expensive product launch. Ries sees the error in both cases as "working forward from the technology instead of working backward from the business results you're trying to achieve."

Instead, Ries argues that to build a great company, one must begin with the customers in the form of interviews and research discovery. Building an MVP (Minimum viable product) and then testing and iterating quickly results in less waste and a better product market fit. Ries also recommends using a process called the Five Whys, a technique designed to reach the core of an issue.

Companies cited in the book as practicing Ries's ideas include Alphabet Energy of California.
Later more organizations have adopted the processes, including Dropbox, Wealthfront, and General Electric.

Reception
According to the publisher, the book "has sold over one million copies and has been translated into more than thirty languages." It was also on The New York Times Best Sellers list.

References

Business books
2011 non-fiction books
Crown Publishing Group books